
Poonindie is a small township near Port Lincoln on the Eyre Peninsula, South Australia. The land upon which it sits was originally the land of the Barngarla people.

Poonindie Mission was established as a mission for Aboriginal people in South Australia in 1850, at the instigation of the first Archdeacon of Adelaide, Mathew Hale, who also served as superintendent for several years. St Matthew's church, built in 1854-55 and originally intended to be the school, served both the mission and the local community. It survives and remains in use today. Hale ran the Aboriginal Training Institution at the mission. His friend, the Anglican Archbishop of Adelaide, Augustus Short, visited the mission, which prospered.

The mission closed  after 44 years, after which the land was divided and sold, with just St Matthew's and a small area of land remaining the property of the Anglican Church.  of land was became an Aboriginal reserve when the Mission closed in 1894. Most of the residents were moved to Point Pearce and Point McLeay missions, while others moved to the nearby Aboriginal reserve, but a small number of residents remained on the mission site until the 1910s.

The institution is named in the Bringing Them Home report, as one which housed Indigenous children forcibly removed from their parents and thus creating the Stolen Generations.
 
The former reserve is now an Aboriginal self-managed Aboriginal community called Akenta, run by Akenta Incorporated.

Pooonindie Uniting Church lies to the north of the township.

Heritage listings
Poonindie has a number of sites associated with the former mission listed on the South Australian Heritage Register, including:

 Poonindie Mission Bakehouse Complex and Well
 Poonindie Mission Superintendent's Residence
 Poonindie Cemetery
 Poonindie Mission Schoolhouse
 St Matthew's Anglican Church

See also
Eyre Peninsula bushfire

Other 19th century Aboriginal missions in SA
Killalpaninna
Koonibba
Point McLeay
Point Pearce

References

Further reading

Towns in South Australia
Eyre Peninsula
Aboriginal communities in South Australia
Australian Aboriginal missions
Mission stations in Australia
1851 establishments in Australia